The 2014 CEMAC Cup is the ninth edition of the CEMAC Cup – the football championship of Central African nations.

The draw was made on 4 October 2014 in Malabo.

Each national team had its own training facility allocated for the duration of the tournament.

Equatorial Guinea in Mbini
Cameroon in Alep
Central African Republic in the Bata Stadium Annex
Gabon in the La Paz stadium
Republic of Congo in the Malabo Stadium Annex
Chad in the Luba Stadium.

Squads

Group stage

Group A

Group B

Knockout stage

Semi-finals

Third-place playoff

Final

Statistics

Goalscorers

4 goals

  Rodrigue Ninga

3 goals

  Léger Djimrangar

2 goals

  Kader Bidimbou
  Hardy Binguila

1 goal

  Manga Bah
  Saïra Issambet
  Grâce Mamic Itoua
  Arci Mouanga Biassadila
  Bama
  Juvenal Edjogo-Owono
  Rubén Darío
  Viera Ellong
  Georges Ambourouet

Awards

Player of the tournament
  Dio
 Top goalscorer
  Rodrigue Ninga (4)
Best goalkeeper 
 Mbairamadji Dillah

References 

CEMAC Cup
Nations
2014 in Equatoguinean sport
International association football competitions hosted by Equatorial Guinea
CEMAC
December 2014 sports events in Africa